Adrian Kurek (born 29 March 1988) is a Polish former professional road bicycle racer, who rode professionally between 2012 and 2021 for the ,  and  teams. Following his retirement, Kurek now coaches the Kuwaiti national cycling team.

He competed at UCI World Tour level on several occasions at his home race, the Tour de Pologne. In the 2011 edition of the race, Kurek won the intermediate sprints classification, having led it from start-to-finish; he also held a top-three place overall in the first three stages. In the 2012 race, Kurek took the lead of the classification after four stages of the event, and held the lead until the end.

Major results

2008
 2nd Overall Tour des Deux Sèvres
2009
 1st Route de l'Atlantique
 2nd Time trial, National Under-23 Road Championships
 2nd Vienne Classic Espoirs
 3rd  Team pursuit, UEC European Under-23 Track Championships
2011
 1st Trophée des Champions
 1st Stage 2 (ITT) Saint Brieuc Agglo-Tour
 1st Stage 3 Tour de Gironde
 1st Stage 4 Trois Jours de Cherbourg
 1st  Sprints classification Tour de Pologne
 2nd Chrono de Tauxigny
 3rd Chrono Châtelleraudais
 4th Overall Tour of Małopolska
 4th Prix Gérard Gautier à Vendeuvre-du-Poitou
 8th Overall Tour de la Dordogne
 8th Circuit Boussaquin
 9th Grand Prix des Fêtes de Cénac et St-Julien
 10th Circuit des Vins du Blayais
2012
 1st  Sprints classification Tour de Pologne
 5th Overall Tour of Małopolska
2013
 7th Overall Dookoła Mazowsza
2014
 2nd Overall Tour of Estonia
1st Stage 2
 3rd  Time trial, World University Road Championships
 8th Overall Dookoła Mazowsza
1st Stage 1 (TTT)
2015
 1st Stage 1b (TTT) Settimana Internazionale di Coppi e Bartali
 1st Stage 3 Tour of Małopolska
 8th Overall Podlasie Tour
1st Prologue
2017
 1st  Road race, National Road Championships
 1st Stage 1b (TTT) Settimana Internazionale di Coppi e Bartali
 9th Overall Course de Solidarność et des Champions Olympiques
2018
 1st Stage 3a (TTT) Sibiu Cycling Tour
 8th Overall Dookoła Mazowsza
 8th Overall Tour de Hongrie
2019
 5th Overall Szlakiem Walk Majora Hubala
 9th Overall Tour of Estonia
 9th Memoriał Romana Siemińskiego
2020
 1st Prologue Tour of Szeklerland
 7th International Rhodes Grand Prix

References

External links

Polish male cyclists
1988 births
Living people
People from Grudziądz